Mircea Valeriu Diaconescu (born 1929) is a Romanian composer based in Germany. He is working on a project for a Romanian psalter based on the model of Clément Marot and Théodore de Bèze.

Works, editions and recordings
 Diaconescu: Lumina Lina on Ex Oriente Lux Bárdos, Eben, Gretchaninov, Karai, Nystedt, Orbán, Pärt, Penderecki, Popovici, Rachmaninov, Sisask, Tchaikovsky. Carmina Mundi Aachen, Harald Nickoll

References

Romanian composers
1929 births
Musicians from Bucharest
Living people
Romanian expatriates in Germany